The 2012–13 Portland Pilots men's basketball team represented the University of Portland during the 2012–13 NCAA Division I men's basketball season. The Pilots were members of the West Coast Conference and were led by seventh-year head coach Eric Reveno. They played their home games at the Chiles Center. They finished the season 11–21, 4–12 in WCC play to finish in a tie for seventh place. They lost in the first round of the WCC tournament to Loyola Marymount.

Before the Season

Departures

Recruitment

Roster

Schedule

|-
!colspan=9| Exhibition

|-
!colspan=9| Regular season

|-
!colspan=9| 2013 West Coast Conference men's basketball tournament

References

Portland
Portland Pilots men's basketball seasons
Port
Port